Island council elections were held in the Netherlands Antilles in 1971. They were the sixth elections for the Island Council,

Aruba

General elections were held in Aruba in 1971. They were the first in which the People's Electoral Movement participated, after Gilberto Croes split from the AVP.

Results

Sint Maarten

General elections were held in Sint Maarten on 7 May 1971 to elect the 5 members of the Island Council. The result was a victory for the Democratic Party, which won four of the five Island Council seats.

Results

References

Netherlands Antilles island council
Election and referendum articles with incomplete results